The Lambertsen Amphibious Respiratory Unit (LARU) is an early model of closed circuit oxygen rebreather used by military frogmen. Christian J. Lambertsen designed a series of them in the US in 1940 (patent filing date: 16 Dec 1940) and in 1944 (issue date: 2 May 1944).

Etymology
The LARU is what the initials SCUBA (Self-Contained Underwater Breathing Apparatus) originally meant; Lambertsen changed his invention's name to SCUBA in 1952; but later "SCUBA", gradually changing to "scuba", came to mean (first in the USA) any self-contained underwater breathing apparatus. (Modern diving regulator technology was invented by Émile Gagnan and Jacques-Yves Cousteau in 1943 and was not related to rebreathers; nowadays the word SCUBA is largely used to mean Gagnan's and Cousteau's invention and its derivatives.)

History
Lambertsen designed the LARU while a medical student and demonstrated the LARU to the Office of Strategic Services (OSS) (after already being rejected by the U.S. Navy) in a pool at the Shoreham Hotel in Washington D.C. in 1942 The OSS "Operational Swimmer Group" was formed and Lambertsen's responsibilities included training and developing methods of combining self-contained diving and swimmer delivery including the LARU.

Design
 Two large lengthways backpack mounted cylinders under a hard metal cover: the right cylinder is high pressure oxygen and the left is the cylindrical absorbent canister.
 Fullface mask with two small viewports like an old-type gasmask
 Two counterlungs, one on each shoulder.
 A breathing conduit of 4 lengths of large-bore corrugated breathing tubes in a loop: from the mask to one of the breathing bags to the canister to the other breathing bag to the mask.
 Its harness is a strong cloth jacket that enclosed the diver's chest.
 Mid front, a long zipped pocket: the diagrams do not show whether it was for kit or for diving weights.

Many diving rebreathers are descended from it. However, there were earlier underwater uses of rebreathers:
 Davis Escape Set for use in emergency by submariners from 1927 onwards
 Siebe Gorman Salvus invented in the 1900s and first used in mines and by firemen
 The rebreathers used by the Italian Decima Flottiglia MAS frogmen in World War II
 Rebreathers used by British frogmen and divers in World War II and led to the 1950s Siebe Gorman CDBA used by the British

See also

References

External links
 A long biography about him, and about the rebreather that he designed
 Images of his rebreather
 Image of Lambertsen rebreather's fullface mask, 1944, with eyeholes
 Front view of frogman swimming with Lambertsen rebreather, 1944
 Lambertsen rebreather with mouthpiece on neck strap, and eyes-and-nose mask, 1944
 Underwater Demolition Team Operations U.S. Navy video demonstrating the Lambertsen rebreather National Archives #76869

Rebreathers
Office of Strategic Services